A constitutional referendum was held in Syria on 12 March 1973. The proposed amendments were approved by 97.8% of voters, with turnout reported to be 88.9%.

Results

References

Syrian constitutional referendum
Constitutional referendum
Syrian constitutional referendum
Referendums in Syria
Constitutional referendums in Syria